Point72 Asset Management, is an American hedge fund. It was founded in 2014 by Steve Cohen, after his previous company S.A.C. Capital Advisors pleaded guilty to insider trading charges.

In 2018, the company reopened to external investors after a two-year ban and began accepting outside capital. The company's office is located in Stamford, Connecticut.

History

2014 to 2019 
Point72 was founded in 2014 by Steve Cohen as the successor to SAC Capital, after the firm pleaded guilty to federal insider trading charges and paid a $1.8 billion fine. In March 2014, SAC Capital transferred the bulk of its assets to Point72 and was placed in "run-off," or a winding down of its operations.

Vincent Tortorella was hired as chief surveillance officer, and Kevin J. O’Connor, was hired as an in-house attorney. 

In August 2014, Douglas D. Haynes was appointed president and Timothy Shaughnessy was appointed CEO. Shaughnessy retired in 2018 and was replaced by Gavin O'Connor, who joined the firm from Goldman Sachs.

There are satellite offices in New York City, Hong Kong, Tokyo, Singapore, London, Paris, Sydney, Warsaw and Palo Alto.

2020 to present 
In August 2020 the firm closed to new money with just over $17 billion under management.

In January 2021, along with Ken Griffin's Citadel Securities, Point72 contributed $750 million to a $2.75 billion emergency bailout of Melvin Capital, a hedge fund that had incurred deep losses in the GameStop short squeeze; Melvin Capital is run by Gabe Plotkin, a former protégé of Steven Cohen and one of the managers of SAC whose trades were investigated by the SEC. In the first half of 2021, Point72 was reported to have lost $500 million on its investment in Melvin Capital.

Gender bias lawsuits 
The New York Times reported that Point72 President Douglas D. Haynes who was hired as managing director for human capital and then became President resigned in March 2018 "amid [a] gender bias lawsuit" and was replaced as president by Cohen.

The firm has faced multiple lawsuits from employees alleging gender and pay discrimination. In September 2020 Point72 settled a gender/pay discrimination suit brought by Lauren Bonner the former Head of Talent Analytics.

References

Companies based in Stamford, Connecticut
Financial services companies established in 1992
Hedge fund firms in Connecticut
Hedge funds